Gangalee is the sixth studio album by Puerto Rican singer and songwriter Farruko, released on April 26, 2019, through Sony Music Latin. It was produced by Sharo Towers, DJ Rome, George Noriega, Álex Gárgolas, Rvssian, Dímelo Flow, Jumbo "El Que Produce Solo", Land Za, O'Neill, Rec808 and Frank Miami, and features collaborations with Anuel AA, Bad Bunny, J Balvin, Pedro Capó, Alicia Keys, Manuel Turizo, among others.

The album peaked at numbers 2 and 80 at the Top Latin Albums and Billboard 200 charts. It was certified 6× platinum in United States.

Track listing

Charts

Weekly charts

Year-end charts

Certifications

References

2019 albums
Farruko albums